KMFX-FM (102.5 MHz "102.5 The Fox") is a radio station in Rochester, Minnesota airing a country music format. The station is owned by iHeartMedia, Inc. headquartered in Lake City MN

From 1994 to 2008, KMFX-FM was simulcast on KMFX (1190 AM) in Wabasha; the AM station was sold in 2011 and now carries a separate country format as WBHA.

External links
102.5 The Fox official website

Country radio stations in the United States
Radio stations in Minnesota
Radio stations established in 1991
IHeartMedia radio stations